Verónica María Alonso Montaño (born October 24, 1973) is a Uruguayan businesswoman and political figure of the National Party.

Early life and education 
Alonso was born in Montevideo in 1973. She had five brothers and she was brought up as a Catholic. 

She began studying International Relations at the University of the Republic, but obtained her degree from the Universidad ORT Uruguay. She has a postgraduate Diploma in International Relations and Latin American Political Development from the Miguel de Cervantes University in Santiago. She has completed the courses, but has pending delivery and defense of the thesis for a master's degree in Integration and International Trade at the Law School of the University of Montevideo.

Political career 
She began her political career began in the Wilsonist Current, a faction of the National Party, supporting then-senator Francisco Gallinal. In 2009 general election, she supported former president Luis Alberto Lacalle Herrera. And that year was elected National Representative for Montevideo Department. Her first legislation was to propose to the Chamber of Representatives to exempt private companies from paying employer contributions after they employed workers who were over forty years old.

In the 2014 presidential primaries, Alonso supported the pre-candidacy of Senator Jorge Larrañaga, who was defeated in the internal election of the National Party by Luis Lacalle Pou. In the general election of that year, in which Lacalle Pou was the candidate for the National Party, she joined the National Alliance faction, being elected Senator of the Republic.

In July 2018, Alonso announced her presidential pre-candidacy for the 2019 presidential primaries. However, on April 8, 2019 she withdrew it to support the nomination of businessman Juan Sartori, stating "we are going to define the intern of the National Party." Finally, Lacalle Pou defeated Sartori in the presidencial primaries, and was the candidate of the PN in the 2019 general election. At it, Alonso ran for reelection as Senator, without being elected.

In July 2020, Alonso claimed in an interview that she had been wrong to support Juan Sartori's nomination, stating "I made a wrong decision, but I can't turn back time."  As a consequence, Sartori's supporter faction reported that Alonso had been "excluded" from it.

Private life
Alonso married Marcel Gerwer in 2000. Together they have three daughters, Camila, Delfina and Violeta. She was brought up a catholic but converted to Judaism at the time of her marriage.

During the COVID-19 pandemic in Uruguay a hotel owned by her family let rooms at $7 a day. The fees were paid by the state and allowed homeless people to find a place to stay. The Hotel Urban Express is owned by her husband's family and is normally charged at $45 a night. It was pointed out that other hotels had refused to allow street people to use their facilities and at $7 a night the hotel would fail to cover the hotel's costs. Critics were told that $7 dollars a night was not a charge, but virtually a donation.

References 

21st-century Uruguayan women politicians
21st-century Uruguayan politicians
1973 births
Living people
People from Montevideo
National Party (Uruguay) politicians